Annie Pixley (née Annie Shea, c.1848 – November 8, 1893) was an American stage actress.

Pixley was born in Brooklyn, and she moved with her family to San Francisco. After her father died, her mother married a California rancher, and Annie took his last name, Pixley.

She made her debut performing comic opera and was well known for her work on stage. She went to Australia in 1876 and performed in comic opera there. Pixley's work in the United States included portraying the widow in The Danites and Gretchen in Rip Van Winkle. On Broadway, Pixley produced, and portrayed Ruth Homewebb, in The Deacon's Daughter (1887).

Pixley was married to Robert Fulford. Their 12-year-old son, Tommy, died in 1886, after which Pixley "lost her ebullience and her nimble grace".

She died November 8, 1893, of brain fever in London, Ontario, Canada. Her ashes and those of her husband and son are in a mausoleum in the Woodland cemetery there.

References

External links

Annie Pixley; North American Theatre Online(AlexanderStreet.com)
portraits: one,..two, ..three(North American Theatre Online)
Annie Pixley wonderful girlish portrait of Annie Pixley by B. F. Falk(archived)

1848 births
1893 deaths
19th-century American actresses
American stage actresses
Actresses from California
Actresses from New York City